William Sheehey (born January 16, 1992) is a retired American professional basketball player. He played college basketball for Indiana University.

High school career
As a resident of Stuart, Florida, Sheehey attended South Fork High School as a sophomore and junior. As a sophomore in 2007–08, he averaged 17 points, 8.5 rebounds and 4.5 assists per game and as a junior in 2008–09, he averaged 24.6 points, 10 rebounds and nearly three assists per game. As a senior at Sagemont School in 2009–10, he averaged 14 points, seven rebounds and four assists. During the summer, Sheehey played AAU basketball for the Florida Rams.

Sheehey was named to the Class 2A second team All-State. He was ranked as the No. 45 small forward in his class by Scout.com, and No. 141 overall and No. 40 small forward by Rivals.com. He was also nominated for the McDonald's All-American Game and was named to the Florida vs. U.S.A. Hardwood Classic All-Star team.

College career
Sheehey chose to play basketball at Indiana and major in legal studies, turning down offers from Arizona State, Michigan and Georgia Tech. Of his commitment, Sheehey said, "I chose Indiana because it was the best combination of basketball, academics and social life."

Freshman season
As a freshman during the 2010–11 season, Sheehey played in 32 games and started seven. His breakout game was against Mississippi Valley State, contributing nine points, five rebounds, two steals and an assist in 11 minutes off the bench. His contributions continued to grow throughout the season. His dunk in a game against Iowa on February 5, 2011, was a finalist for Papa John's Dunk of the Year.

Sophomore season
As a sophomore during the 2011–12 season, Sheehey averaged 8.6 points and 3.1 rebounds in 22.4 minutes per game (50.5% FG, 70.4% FT). He started 11 of the 31 games he played in, particularly toward the end of the season. The Hoosiers' record in 2011–2012 improved by fifteen games over the prior season, making it the largest single turnaround in the NCAA that year. The team earned a number-four seed in the 2012 NCAA Tournament and defeated New Mexico State in the second round. After defeating VCU in the third round, the Hoosiers lost in the Sweet Sixteen to Kentucky, the eventual national champions.

Junior season
As a junior during the 2012–13 season, Sheehey's talents were integral to the team's success. CBS Sports columnist Jon Rothstein said, "You can't measure what Will Sheehey does for Indiana with a box score. The 6-7 swing man brings unbelievable intangibles to the Hoosiers on a nightly basis and regularly guards several of the opponent's top offensive options...not enough credit goes to Sheehey — a player who always seems to be around a loose ball whenever it hits the floor." That season the Hoosiers won the outright Big Ten championship. Sheehey averaged 9.5 points per game off the bench, among the best in the Big Ten, to go along with 3.7 rebounds and 1.3 assists per game. He was honored as the Big Ten Sixth Man of the Year by the coaches.

Senior season
As a senior during the 2013–14 season, Sheehey earned Big Ten All-Sportsmanship Team honors and was named to the Reese's NCAA D1 All-Star Game. In 31 games, he averaged 11.4 points, 4.0 rebounds and 1.8 assists per game.

College statistics

|-
| style="text-align:left;"| 2010–11
| style="text-align:left;"| Indiana
| 32 || 7 || 13.8 || .484 || .304 || .649 || 2.1 || 0.4 || 0.4 || 0.2 || 4.8
|-
| style="text-align:left;"| 2011–12
| style="text-align:left;"| Indiana
| 31 || 11 || 22.4 || .505 || .383 || .704 || 3.1 || 1.1 || 0.5 || 0.2 || 8.6
|-
| style="text-align:left;"| 2012–13
| style="text-align:left;"| Indiana
| 36 || 1 || 22.3 || .486 || .346 || .656 || 3.5 || 1.3 || 0.8 || 0.2 || 9.5
|-
| style="text-align:left;"| 2013–14
| style="text-align:left;"| Indiana
| 31 || 31 || 30.3 || .472 || .330 || .690 || 4.0 || 1.8 || 0.9 || 0.3 || 11.4
|- class="sortbottom"
| style="text-align:center;" colspan="2"| Career
| 130 || 50 || 22.1 || .486 || .343 || .676 || 3.2 || 1.1 || 0.7 || 0.2 || 8.6

Professional career
After going undrafted in the 2014 NBA draft, Sheehey joined the New York Knicks for the 2014 NBA Summer League. On August 1, 2014, he signed a one-year deal with Budućnost Podgorica of Montenegro. On December 16, 2014, he parted ways with Budućnost after appearing in nine league games and nine Eurocup games.

On January 28, 2015, Sheehey was acquired by the Fort Wayne Mad Ants of the NBA Development League. On March 6, he was waived by the Mad Ants after appearing in eight games. Six days later, he was acquired by the Los Angeles D-Fenders. On April 11, 2015, after the end of the 2014–15 D-League season, he signed with Panionios of Greece for the rest of the 2014–15 Greek League season.

In July 2015, Sheehey joined the New Orleans Pelicans for the 2015 NBA Summer League. On July 29, he signed with SO Maritime Boulogne of the French LNB Pro B.

On October 30, 2016, Sheehey was acquired by Raptors 905 of the D-League.

On August 7, 2017, Sheehey signed with FC Porto of the Liga Portuguesa de Basquetebol.

Sheehey signed with s.Oliver Würzburg of the German Basketball Bundesliga on June 17, 2019.

On December 28, 2019, he signed with Porto of the Liga Portuguesa de Basquetebol (LPB).

The Basketball Tournament (TBT) (2015–present) 
In the summers of 2015, '16, and 2017, Sheehey played in The Basketball Tournament on ESPN for team Armored Athlete.  He competed for the $2 million prize, and for team Armored Athlete in 2017, he averaged 9.5 points per game.  Sheehey helped take team Armored Athlete in 2017 to the West Regional Championship, where they lost to Team Challenge ALS 75-63.

Post-playing career

Sheehey retired from playing in 2020, and worked in software services.  In September 2021 he joined the Golden State Warriors as a video coordinator, and was part of the staff for the 2022 NBA Championship.

Personal
Sheehey married his wife, Nicole Jaderberg, in 2017. Sheehey is the son of Dawn Mailloux and Michael Sheehey, who played basketball at Syracuse and Saint Bonaventure. His uncle, Tom Sheehey, was a standout basketball player for Virginia and was drafted by the Boston Celtics and played professionally in Spain.

References

External links
 Eurobasket.com profile
 Fiba.com profile
 Indiana Hoosiers bio

1992 births
Living people
ABA League players
American expatriate basketball people in Canada
American expatriate basketball people in France
American expatriate basketball people in Greece
American expatriate basketball people in Montenegro
American expatriate basketball people in Portugal
American men's basketball players
Basketball players from Florida
FC Porto basketball players
Fort Wayne Mad Ants players
Indiana Hoosiers men's basketball players
KK Budućnost players
Los Angeles D-Fenders players
Panionios B.C. players
People from Weston, Florida
Raptors 905 players
Small forwards
SOMB Boulogne-sur-Mer players
Sportspeople from Broward County, Florida
People from Stuart, Florida